Gunfight in Abilene is a 1967 American Western film starring Bobby Darin in a non-singing role. It is the second film based on the short story "Gun Shy" by Clarence Upson Young, the first being Showdown at Abilene (1956), starring Jock Mahoney in the role played by Darin in the remake.

Plot
During the Civil War, Cal Wayne accidentally kills a fellow Confederate soldier who was also a long-time friend. After the war, Wayne returns to his hometown of Abilene, Kansas where he discovers his sweetheart, Amy - who thought he was dead - about to marry cattle baron Grant Evers, the brother of the man Wayne killed. To try to assuage his guilt, Wayne refuses to try to win Amy back.

A feud is ongoing between local cattlemen and farmers. Evers takes it upon himself to exact harsh justice against anyone, with or without proof, who crosses him and his growing business.

Reluctantly, but at Evers' behest, Wayne replaces the corrupt sheriff, Joe Slade. Haunted by the fact that he killed Evers' brother, Wayne insists he will not wear a gun and wants everyone who comes into town to surrender their weapons.

However, as the situation between the farmers and the cattlemen intensifies and erupts, and Grant Evers is murdered, Wayne chooses to strap on a weapon and settle things for himself, and for Abiliene.

Cast
 Bobby Darin as Cal Wayne 
 Emily Banks as Amy Martin
 Leslie Nielsen as Grant Evers
 Donnelly Rhodes as Joe Slade
 Don Galloway as Ward Kent
 Frank McGrath as Ned Martin
 Michael Sarrazin as Cord Decker
 Barbara Werle as Leann
 Johnny Seven as Loop
 Don Dubbins as Sprague

See also
List of American films of 1967

External links
 
 
 
 
 

1967 films
1960s English-language films
1967 Western (genre) films
Films based on short fiction
American Western (genre) films
Films directed by William Hale (director)
Universal Pictures films
1960s American films